Marvel Zombies: Dead Days is a comic book one-shot first published in May 2008 by Marvel Comics. It was written by Robert Kirkman and drawn by Sean Phillips, with cover art by Arthur Suydam. It is part of the Marvel Zombies series. The issue is a prequel to Marvel's first Marvel Zombies limited series, which had the same creative team. The story shows the events of the zombie plague first infecting the Marvel Zombies Universe.

The story takes place during the events of the second issue of Marvel Zombies vs. The Army of Darkness.

Plot
Spider-Man reaches Mary Jane Watson-Parker and Aunt-May Parker to find them safe and sound. When questioned about the current situation, Peter confesses to being bitten by Colonel America. Peter then succumbs to the virus, attacking Mary Jane as Aunt May runs into the room in dismay.

As the battle between infected zombies and non-infected humans rages on, Magneto, on board Asteroid M, feels sorry for bringing the virus to Earth-2149 and returns to the planet to help. Nova arrives at the Parker flat to find the zombified Spider-Man devouring the slain Mary Jane and Aunt May and tries to reason with him. At this point Daredevil shows up to explain to Nova what is going on, and that the rules have changed. Daredevil is infected by Zombie Peter in the process.

Meanwhile, the zombified Colonel America has a moment of clarity and leads the rest of the infected Avengers to the Avengers Mansion to try to find a cure for the virus. At the Xavier Institute for Gifted Youngsters in Salem Center, Westchester County, Storm, Cyclops, Wolverine, Nightcrawler, Shadowcat and Colossus try to fend off the newly undead Alpha Flight (including Sasquatch) to protect the surviving students in the mansion, although Professor Xavier has already been killed by the Alpha Flight zombies. Magneto shows up and recruits the X-Men to work with him in fighting the zombified heroes after disposing of the zombified Alpha Flight.

Aiming to find a cure Giant Man and Black Panther make their way to his lab.  Black Panther realizes Giant Man is infected, but is knocked unconscious by Giant Man before he can do anything. Zombie Giant Man plans to keep Black Panther as a living cadaver to save him the trouble of searching for food when the infection spreads.

Quicksilver seemingly rescues his sister Scarlet Witch from Zombie Black Cat only to be revealed that it is actually a Zombie Mystique in disguise who proceeds to bite and infect Quicksilver thus spreading the disease from North America (United States and Canada) to other parts of the Earth such as Britain, Russia and Japan.

As the battle rages on, Mister Fantastic, Invisible Woman, The Thing, and the Human Torch mourn the death of Franklin Richards and Valeria Richards at the hands of She-Hulk, who has been infected. As Sue kills Zombie She-Hulk there is an incoming transmission from Nick Fury.

Back in the heat of battle, Thor fights against his previous allies including zombified Giant Man. Nova shows up to help Thor in the brawl. The Fantastic Four arrive in their Fantasticar to lead Thor and Nova to the S.H.I.E.L.D. Helicopter where Nick Fury is calling all the remaining superheroes and villains together in an attempt to counter the virus.

Nick Fury informs all that the epicenter of the infection was in New York City specifically Manhattan. The Avengers were first on the scene and as such first to be infected. He also declares that anyone who isn't infected should be considered an ally.  Nick Fury puts Iron Man, Hulk, and Mr. Fantastic into researching a cure for the contagion. Fury then assigns everyone else to go out and rescue who they can.  Nova protests that the infection is too far gone to be stopped, but is silenced by Fury.

Zombie Giant-Man arrives back at the Avengers Mansion, infected and looking for a new snack in Jarvis. Realizing the other Avengers have beaten him to it, the Zombie Avengers talk about their resolution to give up the fight and accept their new condition.

Dr. Doom watches the ongoing fight from his secure fortress at Latveria and refuses to aid Fury in his plans.

Back on the Helicarrier, Mister Fantastic is busy researching a zombie. Sue walks in asking why he is not helping Iron Man and Hulk with their research for a cure, which Mister Fantastic defends by saying that they are approaching the problem from all angles. The Fantastic Four then get in a fight over Mister Fantastic's thoughts that the zombies are like advanced lifeforms.

Fury checks on Iron Man who has decided to build a machine that will teleport them to an alternate universe similar to their own, reasoning that reconstruction would take too long with so many dead even if the virus was stopped immediately. Iron Man hopes to have the machine operational as soon as possible.

Back on the ground, the resistance is losing the fight against the zombies, with Wolverine and Nova succumbing to the virus, and have to retreat back to the helicopter.

Mister Fantastic calls the rest of the Fantastic Four to his lab to discuss his findings. Insane, Reed now believes that the infection is evolution and as such has infected the team. Reed then allows them to feed on him and in turn infect him, wanting to experience the change himself.

Just as Iron Man finishes the machine, the Zombified Fantastic Four burst into the room and infect him. Fury grabs the machine and pulls it into a small room where some of the last remaining heroes have gathered. Realizing that completing the machine will give the zombies the opportunity to spread their infection to other realities, Fury commands Thor to destroy the machine and for this the zombies kill him, while turning the remaining heroes.

When asked what will happen next, Zombie Reed responds that he shall rebuild the machine and "spread the gospel."

Collected editions
A trade hardcover edition of Marvel Zombies: Dead Days was released which collected the issue, along with the Ultimate Fantastic Four story arcs, Crossover and Frightful where the Marvel Zombies made their first appearance.

 Marvel Zombies Dead Days (collects Marvel Zombies: Dead Days, Ultimate Fantastic Four #21-23, #30-32, and Black Panther #28-30, 272 pages, hardcover, softcover, January 2009)

References

External links

Comics by Robert Kirkman
Comics set in New York City
Prequel comics
Marvel Zombies
Marvel Comics one-shots